The Woodlawn Historic and Archeological District encompasses a historic plantation near the Rappahannock River in southern King George County, Virginia.  The  property is located east of US Route 301 near Port Conway.  The estate boundaries are essentially the same as those when the plantation was first established in 1790.  The main plantation house dates to that time although it has been extended and altered over the intervening centuries.  Also of notable interest on this property are surviving antebellum slave quarters, and archaeological sites containing evidence of Native American occupation of the land.

The plantation was listed on the National Register of Historic Places in 1991.

See also
National Register of Historic Places listings in King George County, Virginia

References

Georgian architecture in Virginia
Greek Revival architecture in Virginia
Colonial Revival architecture in Virginia
King George County, Virginia
Historic districts on the National Register of Historic Places in Virginia
National Register of Historic Places in King George County, Virginia
Slave cabins and quarters in the United States